''This article deals with the censor. For the Caesar (335-337) Flavius Dalmatius, son of the censor, see Dalmatius.

Flavius Dalmatius (died 337), also known as Dalmatius the Censor, was a censor (333), and a member of the Constantinian dynasty, which ruled over the Roman Empire at the beginning of the 4th century.

Dalmatius was the son of Constantius Chlorus and Flavia Maximiana Theodora, and thus half-brother of the Emperor Constantine I.

Dalmatius spent his youth in the Gallic Tolosa. It is probable that his two sons, Dalmatius and Hannibalianus, were born here. During the mid-320s, Flavius Dalmatius returned to Constantinople, to the court of his half-brother, and was appointed consul and censor in 333.

In Antioch, Flavius was responsible for the security of the eastern borders of the realm. During this period, he examined the case of bishop Athanasius of Alexandria, an important opponent of Arianism, who was accused of murder. In 334, Flavius suppressed the revolt of Calocaerus, who had proclaimed himself emperor in Cyprus. In the following year he sent some soldiers to the council of Tyros to save the life of  Athanasius.

His two sons were appointed to important offices under Constantine's administration, but Flavius Dalmatius and his sons were killed in the purges that followed the Emperor's death in May 337.

External links 
 Roman Emperors DIR

337 deaths
4th-century Romans
Flavius
Flavii
Imperial Roman consuls
Ancient Roman murder victims
Year of birth unknown
Sons of Roman emperors